Bill Greenwood may refer to:

Bill Greenwood (baseball) (1857–1902), American professional baseball player
Bill Greenwood (cricketer) (1909–1979), English cricketer
Bill Greenwood (reporter) (1942–2020), American reporter for ABC News